Berrett is the name of several people:

James Berrett (born 1989), professional footballer
LaMar C. Berrett (1926–2007), American professor
Marcus Berrett (born 1975), English squash player
Tim Berrett (born 1965), race walker
William E. Berrett (1902–1993), American author